Ramón Mercader (Jaime Ramón Mercader del Río, 7 February 1913 – 18 October 1978), was a Spanish  Communist and NKVD secret agent who assassinated the Bolshevik revolutionary Leon Trotsky in Mexico City, in August 1940. For murdering the exiled Russian Communist with an ice axe, Mercader was imprisoned for 19 years and 8 months in Mexico. 

In 1960, after release from Mexican imprisonment, the NKVD agent Mercader was awarded the Hero of the Soviet Union medal and the Order of Lenin medal, and lived a peripatetic life among socialist countries, Cuba, and the USSR.

Life
Jaime Ramón Mercader del Río was born on 7 February 1913 in the town of Argentona, in Maresme county, Catalonia, to Eustaquia María Caridad del Río Hernández (aka Caridad Mercader), daughter of a Cantabrian merchant who became rich from his business in the Captaincy General of Cuba, and Pau Mercader Marina, son of a Catalonian textile industrialist. Jaime Ramón was raised in France by his mother Caridad, who also was a communist who soldiered and fought in the Spanish Civil War, and also served in the Soviet international underground.

In the mid-1930s, young Mercader became a Communist and worked for leftist organizations during the existence of the Second Spanish Republic (1931–1939), and was imprisoned for his political activities, but then was freed when the left-wing coalition of the Popular Front were elected as the government of Spain in 1936. During the civil war, he was recruited by Nahum Eitingon, an officer of the NKVD (People's Commissariat for Internal Affairs), who sent Mercader for secret agent training in the USSR.

Mercader’s befriending and infiltration of the Trotskyite communist faction began during the Spanish Civil War. As a secret agent of the NKVD, Mercader met with the war correspondent David Crook, an English communist and volunteer soldier for the Republican side, in the city of Albacete, Castilla–La Mancha, and there taught him the Spanish language and trained him in the techniques of espionage. Moreover, as a correspondent for the News Chronicle, NKVD agent Cook spied on Orwell and his fellow militiamen of the POUM (Workers’ Party of Marxist Unification) of the Independent Labour Party.

Assassination of Trotsky
In 1938, whilst a student at the University of Paris (the Sorbonne), with the help of Mark Zborowski, Mercader befriended Sylvia Ageloff, a young intellectual woman from Brooklyn, New York, who also was a confidante of Trotsky in Paris. As friend to Ageloff, Mercader assumed the identity of Jacques Mornard, the son of a Belgian diplomat. In 1939, a man from the Bureau of the Fourth International communicated with Mercader; and the student Ageloff had returned to Brooklyn in September 1939, where Mercader joined her under the assumed Canadian identity of Frank Jacson, facilitated by and with the passport of Tony Babich, a Canadian volunteer soldier in the Spanish Republican Army killed in battle. To assuage her suspicions about his true identity, Mercader told Ageloff that he had bought a false identity in order to avoid military service.

In October 1939, Mercader moved to Mexico City and persuaded Ageloff to join him there. Leon Trotsky was living with his family in Coyoacán, then a village on the southern fringes of Mexico City. He was exiled from the Soviet Union after losing the power struggle against Stalin's rise to authority.

Trotsky had been the subject of an armed attack against his house, mounted by allegedly Soviet-recruited locals, including the Marxist-Leninist muralist David Alfaro Siqueiros. The attack was organised and prepared by Pavel Sudoplatov, deputy director of the foreign department of the NKVD. In his memoirs, Sudoplatov claimed that, in March 1939, he had been taken by his chief, Lavrentiy Beria, to see Stalin. Stalin told them that "if Trotsky is finished the threat will be eliminated" and gave the order that "Trotsky should be eliminated within a year."

After that attack failed, a second team was sent, headed by Eitingon, formerly the deputy GPU agent in Spain. He allegedly was involved in the kidnap, torture, and murder of Andreu Nin. The new plan was to send a lone assassin against Trotsky. The team included Mercader and his mother Caridad. Sudoplatov claimed in his autobiography Special Tasks that he selected Ramón Mercader for the task of carrying out the assassination.

Through his lover Sylvia Ageloff's access to the Coyoacán house, Mercader, as Jacson, began to meet with Trotsky, posing as a sympathizer to his ideas, befriending his guards, and doing small favors.  He made drawings of the villa to help the other groups of assassins. Trotsky's grandson Esteban Volkov, aged 14 at the time of the assassination, emphasized that Jacson had been present in Trotsky's house during the first attack led by Siqueiros.

On 20 August 1940, Mercader was alone with Trotsky in his study under the pretext of showing the older man a document. Mercader struck Trotsky from behind and mortally wounded him on the head with an ice axe while he was looking at the document.

The blow failed to kill Trotsky, and he got up and grappled with Mercader. Hearing the commotion, Trotsky's guards burst into the room and beat Mercader nearly to death. Trotsky, deeply wounded but still conscious, ordered them to spare his attacker's life and let him speak.

Caridad and Eitingon were waiting outside the compound in separate cars to provide a getaway, but when Mercader did not return, they left and fled the country.

Trotsky was taken to a hospital in the city and operated on but died the next day as a result of severe brain injuries.

Trotsky's guards turned Mercader over to the Mexican authorities, and he refused to acknowledge his true identity. He only identified himself as Jacques Mornard. Mercader claimed to the police that he had wanted to marry Ageloff, but Trotsky had forbidden the marriage. He alleged that a violent quarrel with Trotsky had led to his wanting to murder Trotsky.

He stated:

In 1943, Jacques Mornard was convicted of murder and sentenced to 20 years in prison by the Sixth Criminal Court of Mexico. His true identity as Ramón Mercader eventually was confirmed by the Venona project after the fall of the Soviet Union.

Sylvia Ageloff was arrested by the Mexican police as an accomplice because she had lived with Mercader, on and off, for about two years up to the time of the assassination. Charges against her eventually were dropped by Mexican authorities, however some still consider that she was a GPU agent.

Murder weapon
The ice axe recovered by the Mexico City police was stored in an evidence room for several years until it was "checked out" by a secret police officer, named Alfredo Salas, who claimed he wanted to preserve it "for posterity." It was a mountaineering ice axe known in French as a piolet, made by the Austrian manufacturer Werkgen Fulpmes. Mercader cut off about half the length of the handle. He claimed to be an experienced mountaineer, and bragged to police interrogators, "I had a rare ability to handle the piolet, since two blows were sufficient for me to crack through an enormous block of ice".

Salas passed the ice axe on to his daughter, Ana Alicia, who eventually put it up for sale in 2005. Trotsky's grandson, Esteban Volkov, stated that he is "unconcerned" about the fate of the alleged murder weapon and wondered "if it is the real axe." The ice axe was bought by Keith Melton, an American collector and author of books on the history of espionage, and is now on display at the International Spy Museum, in Washington, D.C.

Aftermath: release and honors
Shortly after the assassination, Joseph Stalin presented Mercader's mother Eustaquia Caridad with the Order of Lenin for her part in the operation.

After the first few years in prison, Ramón Mercader requested to be released on parole, but the request was denied by the Mexican authorities. They were represented by Jesús Siordia and the criminologist Alfonso Quiroz Cuarón. In 1943, Caridad Mercader applied to Stalin personally for her part in the secret operation to release Ramon Mercader. In 1944, she obtained a permit to leave the USSR. However, contrary to the agreed-upon conditions, she not only led the attempt of release of Ramón at a distance, but traveled to Mexico, where she was known not only as the mother of Ramón, but also as an organizer of the assassination. That undermined an undercover operation that was being prepared to get Ramón Mercader out of jail. Caridad Mercader's presence proved to be counterproductive; although she improved the life of Ramón in prison significantly, the Mexican authorities tightened security measures, causing the Soviets to abandon their efforts to release Ramón. Though Caridad reported important things to the Mexican authorities, Ramón served 19 years and eight months in prison (including the time under initial investigation and trial) according to the initial trial's 20-years-and-one-day conviction. Ramón, who according to his brother Luis never shared his mother's passion for the communist cause, never forgave her for her interference.
After almost 20 years in prison, Mercader was released from Mexico City's Palacio de Lecumberri prison on 6 May 1960. He moved to Havana, Cuba, where Fidel Castro's new socialist government welcomed him.

In 1961, Mercader moved to the Soviet Union and subsequently was presented with the country's highest decoration, Hero of the Soviet Union, personally by Alexander Shelepin, the head of the KGB. He divided his time between Czechoslovakia, from where he traveled to different countries, Cuba, where he was the advisor of the Foreign Affairs Ministry, and the Soviet Union for the rest of his life. He married a Mexican named Rogalia in prison after 1940 and had two children.

Ramón Mercader died in Havana in 1978 of lung cancer. He is buried under the name Ramón Ivanovich Lopez (Рамон Иванович Лопес) in Moscow's Kuntsevo Cemetery. His last words are said to have been: "I hear it always. I hear the scream. I know he's waiting for me on the other side."

Decorations and awards
 Hero of the Soviet Union, 1940 (in absentia) according to Isaac Don Levine  (1959)
 Hero of the Soviet Union, May 31, 1960

In popular culture
There have been many documentaries about the assassination and Mercader over the years. A Spanish documentary about Mercader's life, called Asaltar los cielos ("Storm the skies"), was released in 1996 while a Spanish-language documentary, El Asesinato de Trotsky, was co-produced in 2006 by The History Channel and Anima Films as a joint US/Argentine production, and directed by Argentinian director Matías Gueilburt. There have been also many films, such as the 1972 Joseph Losey-directed The Assassination of Trotsky, featuring Alain Delon as Frank Jacson/Mercader and Richard Burton as Trotsky,  and the 2016 film The Chosen, directed by Antonio Chavarrías and filmed in Mexico, which is an account of Trotsky's murder, featuring Alfonso Herrera as Mercader. The Trotsky assassination is depicted in the 2002 film Frida, with Mercader portrayed by Antonio Zavala Kugler (uncredited) and Trotsky by Geoffrey Rush.

In 1967, West German television presented L.D. Trotzki – Tod im Exil ("L. D. Trotsky – Death in exile"), a play in two parts, directed by August Everding, with Peter Lühr in the role of Trotsky. Trotsky, a 2017 Russian Netflix series, features Konstantin Khabenskiy as Trotsky and Maksim Matveyev as Mercader, who is referred in the English subtitles as "Jackson."

Trotskyist veteran Lillian Pollak depicted her friendship with Mercader, then known as Frank Jacson, and the assassination of Trotsky in her self-published 2008 novel The Sweetest Dream while a 2009 novel by U.S. writer Barbara Kingsolver, The Lacuna, includes an account of Trotsky's assassination by "Jacson." Cuban author Leonardo Padura Fuentes' 2009 novel El hombre que amaba a los perros ("The Man Who Loved Dogs") refers to the lives of both Trotsky and Mercader.

David Ives' Variations on the Death of Trotsky is a short one-act comedy drama based on Mercader's assassination of Trotsky written for the series of one-act plays titled All in the Timing.

See also
 África de las Heras
 Great Purge
 Leon Trotsky Museum, Mexico City
 Moscow Trials

References

Further reading
 
 Cabrera Infante, Guillermo (1983): Tres tristes tigres, Editorial Seix Barral, .
 Conquest, Robert (1991): The Great Terror: A Reassessment, Oxford University Press, .
 Andrew, Christopher; Vasili Mitrokhin (1999): The Sword and the Shield, Basic Books, .
 Padura Fuentes, Leonardo (2009): El hombre que amaba a los perros, Tusquets Editores (Narrativa), .
 Jakupi, Gani (2010): Les Amants de Sylvia, Futuropolis, .
 Wilmers, Mary-Kay  (2010): The Eitingons, Verso, .
 International Committee of the Fourth International (1981): How the GPU Murdered Trotsky, New Park,

External links
 Asaltar los Cielos, Spanish documentary about the life of Ramón Mercader, at IMDBase

1913 births
1978 deaths
Burials at Kuntsevo Cemetery
Foreign Heroes of the Soviet Union
People from Barcelona
People from Catalonia
Spanish communists
Spanish assassins
Spanish people convicted of murder
People convicted of murder by Mexico
Spanish people imprisoned abroad
Exiles of the Spanish Civil War in the Soviet Union
People of the KGB
Deaths from lung cancer
Deaths from cancer in Cuba
Exiles of the Spanish Civil War in Cuba
Exiles of the Spanish Civil War in France
Leon Trotsky
1940 murders in Mexico
1940 crimes in Mexico